A church key or churchkey is a North American term for various kinds of bottle openers and can openers.

Etymology 

The term in the beverage-opening sense is apparently not an old one; Merriam-Webster finds written attestation only since the 1950s. Several etymological themes exist. The main one is that the ends of some bottle openers resemble the heads of large keys such as have traditionally been used to lock and unlock church doors.

History 

A church key initially referred to a simple hand-operated device for prying the cap (called a "crown cork") off a glass bottle; this kind of closure was invented in 1892, although there is no evidence that the opener was called a church key at that time. The shape and design of some of these openers did resemble a large simple key. 

In 1935, beer cans with flat tops were marketed, and a device to puncture the lids was needed. The same term, church key, came to be used for this new invention: made from a single piece of pressed metal, with a pointed end used for piercing cans—devised by D. F. Sampson for the American Can Company, which depicted operating instructions on the cans, and typically gave away free "quick and easy" openers with their beer cans.

Gallery

See also 
 Churchkey Can Company

References

External links 

 World Wide Words
 Illustrative historic photos

Food preparation utensils